The 16th Cannes Film Festival was held from 9 to 23 May 1963. The Palme d'Or went to the Il Gattopardo by Luchino Visconti. The festival opened with The Birds, directed by Alfred Hitchcock.

Jury
The following people were appointed as the Jury of the 1963 film competition:

Feature films
Armand Salacrou (France) Jury President
Rouben Mamoulian (USA) Vice President
Jacqueline Audry (France)
Wilfrid Baumgartner (France) (BDF official)
François Chavane (France)
Jean de Baroncelli (France) (critic)
Robert Hossein (France)
Rostislav Yurenev (Soviet Union)
Kashiko Kawakita (Japan)
Steven Pallos (UK)
Gian Luigi Rondi (Italy)
Short films
Henri Alekan (France) President
Robert Alla (France)
Karl Schedereit (West Germany)
Ahmed Sefrioui (Morocco)
Semih Tugrul (Turkey) (journalist)

Official selection

In competition - Feature film
The following feature films competed for the Palme d'Or:

Les Abysses by Nikos Papatakis
Alvorada by Hugo Niebeling
The Cage (La Cage) by Robert Darène
Carom Shots (Carambolages) by Marcel Bluwal
The Cassandra Cat (Až přijde kocour) by Vojtěch Jasný
Codine by Henri Colpi
The Conjugal Bed (L'ape regina) by Marco Ferreri
A Cozy Cottage (Kertes házak utcája) by Tamás Fejér
Empress Wu Tse-Tien (Wu Ze Tian) by Li Han Hsiang
The Fiances (I Fidanzati) by Ermanno Olmi
For Those Who Will Follow (Pour la suite du monde) by Pierre Perrault and Michel Brault
Glory Sky (Ouranos) by Takis Kanellopoulos
The Good Love (El Buen amor) by Francisco Regueiro
Harakiri (Seppuku) by Masaki Kobayashi
How to Be Loved (Jak być kochaną) by Wojciech Has
The Leopard (Il Gattopardo) by Luchino Visconti
Like Two Drops of Water (Als twee druppels water) by Fons Rademakers
Lord of the Flies by Peter Brook
Optimistic Tragedy (Optimisticheskaya tragediya) by Samson Samsonov
El Otro Cristóbal by Armand Gatti
Rat Trap (Le Rat d'Amérique) by Jean-Gabriel Albicocco
This Sporting Life by Lindsay Anderson
To Kill a Mockingbird by Robert Mulligan
Tobacco (Тютюн) by Nikola Korabov
The Venerable Ones (Los Venerables todos) by Manuel Antín
What Ever Happened to Baby Jane? by Robert Aldrich

Films out of competition
The following films were selected to be screened out of competition:
 8½ by Federico Fellini
 The Birds by Alfred Hitchcock

Short film competition
The following short films competed for the Short Film Palme d'Or:

 A fleur d'eau by Alex Seiler
 Bouket zvezdi by Radka Batchvarova
 Citizens Of Tomorrow by Jamie Uys
 The Critic by Ernest Pintoff
 Das Grabmal des Kaisers by Istvan V. Szots
 Di Domenica by Luigi Bazzoni
 La ferriera abbandonata by Aglauco Casadio
 Geel by Costia de Renesse
 Geschwindigkeit by Edgar Reitz
 Le Haricot by Edmond Sechan
 Images du ciel - Égypte o Égypte by Jacques Brissot
 The King's Breakfast by Wendy Toye
 My Flat (Moj stan) by Zvonimir Berkovic
 Nakymaton Kasi by Veronica Leo
 Oslo by Jørgen Roos
 Playa Insolita by Javier Aguirre
 Un Prince Belge de l'Europe, Charles Joseph de Ligne by Jacques Kupissonoff
 Sous le signe de Neptune by A.F. Sulk
 The Ride by Gerald Potterton
 You by Istvan Szabo
 Zeilen by Hattum Hoving
 Zeleznicari by Evald Schorm

Parallel section

International Critics' Week
The following feature films were selected to be screened for the 2nd International Critics' Week (2e Semaine de la Critique):

 Alone or with Others (Seul ou avec d’autres) by Denys Arcand, Denis Héroux, Stéphane Venne (Canada)
 Barnvagnen by Bo Widerberg (Sweden)
 Déjà s’envole la fleur maigre by Paul Meyer (Belgium)
 Hallelujah the Hills by Adolfas Mekas (United States)
 Le Joli Mai by Chris Marker, Pierre Lhomme (France)
 Pelle viva by Giuseppe Fina (Italy)
 Pitfall (Otoshiana) by Hiroshi Teshigahara (Japan)
 Porto das Caixas by Paulo César Saraceni (Brazil)
 Showman by Albert Maysles, David Maysles (United States)
 The Sun in a Net (Slnko v sieti) by Štefan Uher (Czechoslovakia)

Awards

Official awards
The following films and people received the 1963 Official selection awards:
Palme d'Or: The Leopard (Il Gattopardo) by Luchino Visconti
Jury Special Prize:
The Cassandra Cat (Až přijde kocour) by Vojtěch Jasný
Harakiri (Seppuku) by Masaki Kobayashi
Best Screenplay: Dumitru Carabat, Henri Colpi and Yves Jamiaque for Codine
Best Actress: Marina Vlady for The Conjugal Bed (L'ape regina)
Best Actor: Richard Harris for This Sporting Life
Short films
Short Film Palme d'Or:
Le Haricot by Edmond Séchan
In wechselndem Gefälle (A fleur d'eau) by Alexander J. Seiler
Jury Prize - Short Film: Moj Stan by Zvonimir Berković
Special Mention - Short Film: Di Domenica by Luigi Bazzoni & You by István Szabó
Short Film Technical Prize: Zeilen by Hattum Hoving

Independent awards
FIPRESCI
FIPRESCI Prize:
 This Sporting Life by Lindsay Anderson (In competition)
 Le Joli Mai by Chris Marker, Pierre Lhomme (International Critics' Week)
Commission Supérieure Technique
Technical Grand Prize:
 The Cassandra Cat (Až přijde kocour) by Vojtěch Jasný
 Codine by Henri Colpi
OCIC Award
 The Fiances (I Fidanzati) by Ermanno Olmi
Other awards
Gary Cooper Award: To Kill a Mockingbird by Robert Mulligan
Best Evocation of a World-Shattering Epic: Optimistic Tragedy (Optimisticheskaya tragediya) by Samson Samsonov

References

Media

British Pathé: Cannes Film Festival 1963 footage
British Pathé: Cannes Film Festival 1963 Awards
INA: Opening of the 1963 festival (commentary in French)
INA: List of award-winners at the 1963 festival (commentary in French)

External links 
1963 Cannes Film Festival (web.archive)
Official website Retrospective 1963 
Cannes Film Festival:1963  at Internet Movie Database

Cannes Film Festival, 1963
Cannes Film Festival, 1963
Cannes Film Festival